Eucalantica icarusella is a moth in the family Yponomeutidae. It is found in Costa Rica (high elevations of Cartago, Heredia and San José provinces).

The length of the forewings is 5.3-7.9 mm.

Etymology
The species is named after the Greek mythological character Icarus and refers to the white forewing with scarlet dorsal suffusion resembling Icarus' waxy wings burnt by sunlight.

References

Moths described in 2011
Yponomeutidae